The West Indies cricket team toured Pakistan in November to December 1980 and played a four-match Test series against the Pakistan national cricket team. West Indies won the Test series 1–0. West Indies were captained by Clive Lloyd and Pakistan by Javed Miandad. In addition, the teams played a three-match Limited Overs International (LOI) series which West Indies won 3–0.

Test series summary

First Test

Second Test

Third Test

Fourth Test

One Day Internationals (ODIs)

West Indies won the Wills Series 3-0.

1st ODI

2nd ODI

3rd ODI

References

External links

1980 in Pakistani cricket
1980 in West Indian cricket
International cricket competitions from 1980–81 to 1985
Pakistani cricket seasons from 1970–71 to 1999–2000
1980